The president of the Republic of Palau is the head of state and head of government of Palau. The president is directly elected to a four-year term, and can be reelected once in a consecutive manner.

List of presidents

Latest election

See also
First Lady of Palau 
Vice President of Palau
High Commissioner of the Trust Territory of the Pacific Islands

References

Palau
 
Presidents
Government of Palau
Palau, Presidents of
1980 establishments in Palau